Shaykh Hilal  is a Syrian village located in Al-Saan Subdistrict in Salamiyah District, Hama.  According to the Syria Central Bureau of Statistics (CBS), Shaykh Hilal had a population of 834 in the 2004 census. Its inhabitants are predominantly Ismailis.

References 

Ismaili communities in Syria
Populated places in Salamiyah District